Orsilochides variabilis is a species of shield-backed bug in the family Scutelleridae.

References

Scutelleridae
Articles created by Qbugbot
Insects described in 1837